The Rise of Sivagami is an Indian historical fiction novel written by Anand Neelakantan. It acts as a prequel to the film Baahubali: The Beginning. It was originally released in English on 7 March 2017, with Telugu, Malayalam, Hindi and Tamil versions released in April 2017.

The story revolves around Sivagami, a character of Baahubali. The novel is intended to extrapolate the Baahubali films. It also tells the readers more about Kattappa, another important character of the story.

Plot

Sivagami returned to the Mahishmati Kingdom after 12 years, they returned as Sivagami’s former servant Lakshmi was on her deathbed. They broke into her father's former mansion where she recalled many memories she had with her father Devaraya, who was a nobleman. She recovers a manuscript, she visibly remembers Devaraya handing the manuscript to Lakshmi instructing her to give it to her daughter, before the Maharaja’s men barged into his mansion and took him. The manuscript may contain a secret that may redeem her father or condemn him further. Kattapa is a 22-year-old slave whose father “Malayappa  was the personal slave of Maharaja Somadeva. During a hunting party, Maharaja Somadeva is with his sons Bjjaladeva and Mahadeva. Kattappa accidentally got Bjjaladeva’s clothes dirty and Bjjaladeva started hitting Kattappa with a lash in front of everyone. 

Shivappa, Kattapa’s younger brother, who Kattapa secretly smuggled into the hunting party, hit Bijjaladeva after realizing he was hurting Kattapa. Malayappa, seeing this, hit Shivappa in front of everyone and made Kattapa hit Shivappa as well. Kattapa asked for forgiveness that same night Shivappa for hitting him, but Bjjaladeva once again came. He explains how Shivappa can’t just escape with his father’s beating. Prince Mahadeva tried to stop Bjjaladeva but failed. Shivappa starts running for his life as Bijjaladeva chases Shivappa. Shivappa heads towards the elephant Gireesh, who hurts Bijjaladeva after Bjjaladeva strikes the elephants instead of Shivappa. Kattappa saves Bijjaladeva as well as Prince Mahadeva before he gets knocked out. 

He woke up to Maharaja Somadeva thanking him for saving his sons, he was promoted to “servant” of Bijjaladeva. Malayappa and Kattapa thanked Maharaja for their kindness. Parameswara. The blacksmiths reported that the 75-year-old prime minister was unexpectedly running low on Gaurikanta stones, a stone that is extremely valuable and helps swords wield better. 

1 of the blacksmiths was also missing, so they believed he might have stolen them.  Pattaraya, a nobleman, captured the missing blacksmith who stated he didn’t want to work with anyone and reunite with his family. The chief police officer kicked him which revealed that he had stolen the Gaurikanta stones. Unfortunately, the blacksmith escaped. Meanwhile, Sivagami’s foster father Thimma wanted Sivagami at the royal orphanage for no reason and her foster sister wanted to see her for the last time. She ran away when cattle blocked her father’s chariot and her sister followed. But a man who saw her foster sister’s pebbles started chasing them with a spear before Thimma killed the man. He gave a motivational speech to Sivagami which made her reconsider running away and they all continued to go to the orphanage. Kattapa and Shivappa talked for a while about Shivappa’s freedom and he ran away through a field stating he wanted freedom. 

The Maharaja was worried as the blacksmith was found dead on the outskirts of the kingdom and didn't have the stones. Parameswaran told how the stones are definitely in the Mahishmati kingdom as he checked all boats, chariots, and more. Maharaja suggested that nobleman Thimma should work on it, but Parameswara stated that he was a suspect as he wanted to leave his foster daughter at the orphanage, which only means he wanted to flee the country. Thimma arrived at the palace and told the Maharaja he wanted to retire as well as put Sivagami in the royal orphanage. Maharaja was indecisive at first as she was Devaraya the traitor’s daughter but he eventually agreed. Sivagami hated Mahraja Somadeva but made sure to keep quiet. After Maharaja dismissed them they witnessed Maharaja leaving the palace with his son Prince Mahadeva. 

He was extremely handsome and Mahadeva looked up at her and blushed, she was disappointed as she realized she had also blushed, she tried to keep in mind that they were the ones who executed her father. Keki, a eunuch, can suppress Bjjala to come with her to where all the eunuchs danced. They made Bjjala dress like a merchant, and Kattapa followed him as he was Bjjala’s servant. Bjjala was not supposed to leave the palace at night, so he was dressed up as a merchant. They were able to leave the palace and they were heading toward the dance hall. Brihnnala, the head of the Royal Harem was preparing for Prince Bjjala’s arrival. It shows that she is a boy dressed as a girl and his actual name was Dhananjaya. He was the son of Achi Nagamma and an enemy of the Mahishmati Kingdom. He was going to kill both Kattappa and Prince Bjjalla. Meanwhile, Sivagami says her final goodbyes to her foster father as she joins the head warden of the Royal Orphanage Revamma. Maharani Hemativi, Maharaja’s wife was furious at Prince Mahadeva. 

She was asking him where Bjjala had gone, Mahadeva came up with a good lie and kept dreaming about the girl he saw. He then unexpectedly met her but she ignored him, he realized she was with the head warden Revamma. The head warden made her give Mahadeva a bundle and addressed the girl as Sivagami. After they left, he couldn’t stop thinking about Sivagami and kept the bundle she gave close to his heart. Pattaraya the nobleman returned home and hid from all when Nagayya escaped with the stones. A stone fell and he picked it up to use it to get more cash and repay the bribe. Pattaraya was quite an evil nobleman. He returned home where he attempted to hide the stones, only to be stopped by Hidumba, a khanipath, i, and dwarf. Hidimba helped Pattaraya with his evil plans but Hidumba was mad as he believed Pattaraya stole all the stones, and he still hasn’t paid the bribe. Meanwhile, Sivagami goes to the royal orphanage and befriends Kamishki, who is around her age.

Uthanga, an orphan tries to steal Sivagami’s manuscript one day when the Prince, Mahadeva was visiting. She pushes him down the stairs and can get back the manuscript. But felt pity for the boy after the boy lay there motionless. An argument went on about how he fell down the stairs. Prince Mahadeva saves the boy but he can’t walk anymore. Kaminski and Sivagami take care of Uthanga after the incident. Kattapa and Bjjala get there where Bjjala enters Kalika’s den and Bjjala plays around as Kattappa makes sure his master is safe. Hidumba and Pattaraya go to Kalika’s den to gamble with Bjjala. They did this for money as Prince Bjjala was extremely drunk and gambled a lot of money. Kattapa had to escape with Bjjala when he realized Skandadasa and his men had reached Kalika’s den. Skandadasa was the deputy prime minister of Mahishmati. He came from a rare-low caste which was why many noblemen didn’t like him. He always wanted to make sure that he was the rightful successor of Parameswara. Maharani Hemativi told Skandadasa to find both her sons or else Skandadasa will be executed. He easily finds Mahadeva which reveals where Bjjala had gone. Kattapa escapes with Bjjala by a chariot but the chariot breaks mid-way. Kattapa comes face-to-face with Vaithalikas, a tribal group that lived in the forest. Bjjala was asleep so Kattappa fought many Vaithalikas soldiers and killed them until he collapsed supposedly from the two arrows which pierced his abdomen.

Before the two Vaithalikas tribal men were going to kill Kattappa, Bjjala woke up and stabbed them with a spear. At the time Skandadasa and his men had got there and Kattapa told a fake story of how Bjjala had saved the day and not Kattapa. Sivagami encounters her friend in the dead of the night with her lover named Shivappa. Sivagami, later on, befriends Gundu Ramu after a few attempts on her life by the son of the head warden Revamma. Gundu Ramu’s father was a poet who was forced to join a battle and was killed. Sivagami and Gundu Ramu secretly enter the kitchen when all the orphans were outside, including Revamma. The starving Gundu Ramu eats lots of food and Sivagami also joins. They are caught red-handed by Revamma, and Revamma also finds out about Sivagami’s manuscript. Sivagami and Gundu Ramu were given a big beating and were forced to not eat. Revamma threatens Sivagami to tell her what the manuscript said or else she would report it to the royals. 

Sivagami doesn’t tell and Revamma alongside Sivagami and Gundu Ramu goes to the royal chamber. They were only able to meet Skandadasa as Maharaj and Parameswara were busy. Skandadasa knew the language a little but told Revamma it was just holy mantras. Sivagami couldn’t get back her books and Skandadasa started quarreling with Pattaraya. She was scared Skandadasa would find something in the book. Meanwhile, Kattapa was convinced by Skandadasa to tell the true story of that night. It is shown it’s been 3 months and Shivappa still hasn't returned. Kattapa couldn’t serve his master and be slowly reviving. He decided one night to go for his brother when he passes the river and enters the forest. He gets trapped by the Vaithalikas and shortly after starts a duel with them. He luckily doesn’t get hurt and reunites with his brother. He realized Shivappa was serving the Vaithalikas and felt betrayed. 

He is confronted by Bhutaraya, the leader of the Vaithalikas, whose ancestors ruled the region of Mahishmati 300 years ago. Uthama Mahadeva was a betrayed nobleman who sought aid from the Vaithalikas. Uthama Mahadeva was a descendant of Maharaja Somadeva. Uthama Mahadeva betrays the Vaithalikas by stealing Gauriparvat stones, the stones' hide-out was revealed by the supreme commander of the Vaithalikas army Ugranagappa, who had also betrayed the Vaithalikas. Uthama Mahadeva drew the Vaithalikas far into the forest and established the Mahishmati Kingdom. He tricked Ugranagappa to become his loyal slave, Bhutaraya ends the story with Kattappa that he was an ancestor to Ugranagappa. 

Bhutaraya also reveals that he was going to attack the Mahishmati Kingdom and return back to the past. Jeemotha is a sailor who had a good amount of crew members and was hired by Pattaraya to enslave innocent people. The enslaved people then get sold off and most of the money goes to Pattaraya (with a small share to Jeemotha). One day, he attacked a village with his crew and enslaved many. But, he was attacked by Achi Naggama and her woman’s army when all boarded on the ship. All his crew died and he was held hostage, moreover, the enslaved people were saved. Jeemotha stays as a hostage for a few hours before having an opportunity to escape, he escapes by jumping into the great river but not before also holding one of the elite warriors of the women's army named Ally. Sivagami is personally summoned to Skandadasa’s office where he tells her that the manuscript was stolen by her father Devaraya. Meanwhile, Kattapa attempts to escape the Vaitlikhas but ends up in a duel with his own brother Shivappa. He is able to paralyze Shivappa and he carries Shivappa as he tries to escape the Vaitlikas. He nearly falls off the edge of a cliff which would’ve brought him all the way down to a lake. Shivappa acts like he is dead before pushing Kattappa off the cliff, 300 feet below a lake. Back to Jeemotha, Ally was forced to seduce and have sex with Jeemotha just so she doesn’t get killed by Jeemotha. They both spotted an unconscious man and rescued him. That man was Kattapa. Jeemotha carelessly enslaved Kattapa and a nobleman who needed payment from Jeemotha, caught Jeemotha who sold Kattappa to them and both Ally and Jeemotha entered the nobleman’s boat. Ally learned from Jeemotha that at every Mahamakam festival, gaurikantha stones were smuggled through the goddess Kali statue. So, she once escaped the ship and with the help of Kattapa broke the statue. 

Kattappa then escaped but Ally was caught by Jeemotha who pulled out a dagger. Mahapradhana Parameswara (prime minister Parameswara) retired, making Skandadadasa the new Mahapradhana. Pattaraya hated Skanadadasa and tricked Bjjala into obeying Pattaraya every command. Sivagami decided to break into Skandadasa’s house and retrieve her manuscript during the Mahamakam festival. She was able to retrieve the manuscript but witnessed Skandadasa getting killed by Pattaraya. Moreover, Skandadasa threw Sivagami and a small pot full of stones and told her to escape. She escaped, but her friend Kamishki was raped and killed by Bjjaladeva. Gundu Ramu who was given Sivagami’s manuscript was captured by Hidumba. Kattapa returns to the palace and defeats Shivappa who wants to avenge Kamishki’s death. The Vaithlikas enter the palace by dressing up as a bear dancer. The palace caught on fire and the coup came into effect. Sivagami accidentally enters the palace and pushes a man down the stairs before going to the top floor and seeing Maharaja Somadeva alongside his personal slave Malayappa (who is Kattappa and Shivappa's father). Both Maharaj and Malayappa were fighting the Vaithilikas leader Bhuturaya. Bhuturaya injures Malayappa in which Somadeva kills Bhuturaya. Which ends the whole fight and coup. After the victory, Prince Mahadeva is given the titular name Vikramadeva, and Brinhalla helps Sivagami by telling Maharaj that Sivagami killed many Vaitlikas men and even saved the Maharaj. Maharaj promoted Sivagami to bhoomipathi (nobleman). Parameswara is once again the Mahapradhana. Somadeva asked her to execute the man she had pushed down the stairs, who was none other than Thimma, her foster father, who was suspected to have been working with the Vaithlikas. 
Sequel
A Sequel CHATURANGA was announced on 25 July 2020. It is scheduled to be released on 6 August 2020.

ReceptionThe Rise of Sivagami received generally positive reviews. The Indian Express wrote, "Despite its flaws, the book cobbles together enough good elements by the end for readers and especially for fans of the movie to await the next installment."The Hindu wrote, "Matching the film, the book too has grand portrayal of the era, places, people, culture and customs it depicts." The book has also been reviewed by The New Indian Express, Firstpost and India TV.

See also
 Baahubali: Before the BeginningChaturanga (2020 novel)Queen of MahishmathiBaahubali (franchise)''

References

External links

Baahubali (franchise)
Indian English-language novels
Indian historical novels
Novels set in India
Indian novels adapted into television shows
Westland Books books